"Mea Culpa (Part II)" is a song by German musical project Enigma. It was released in April 1991 as the second of four singles from their debut album, MCMXC a.D. (1990). Like their previous single "Sadeness (Part I)", it is sung in French and Greek, though "Mea Culpa (Part II)" also has a line in English, "The time has come". It was the project's second top ten hit in their native Germany, reaching number seven, as well as reaching the top ten in Belgium, Finland, France, Greece, Italy, Portugal, Spain and Switzerland. However, it failed to match the success of "Sadeness (Part I)" in many other countries, reaching number 20 in Ireland, number 59 in Canada and number 55 in both Australia and the United Kingdom. In the United States, the single failed to chart on the Billboard Hot, but reached number seven on the dance chart. The accompanying music video for the song received heavy rotation on MTV Europe.

Critical reception
Pan-European magazine Music & Media wrote, "Follow-up to the mega hit Sadeness Part I: this time there's also the choice of a Catholic mix. How long do we have to wait until Pope John-Paul II takes action?"

Track listings

 7" single
 "Mea Culpa Part II" (orthodox version) – 3:58
 "Mea Culpa Part II" (catholic version) – 3:54

 12" maxi
 "Mea Culpa Part II" (fading shades mix) – 6:15
 "Mea Culpa Part II" (orthodox mix) – 3:58
 "Mea Culpa Part II" (catholic version) – 3:54
 "Mea Culpa Part II" (LP version) – 5:05
 "Communion: O sacrum convivium" – 4:42

 CD single
 "Mea Culpa Part II" (orthodox version) – 3:58
 "Mea Culpa Part II" (catholic version) – 3:54

 CD maxi
 "Mea Culpa Part II" (fading shades mix) – 6:15
 "Mea Culpa Part II" (orthodox mix) – 3:58
 "Mea Culpa Part II" (catholic version) – 3:54

Charts

Weekly charts

Year-end charts

Certifications

References

1991 singles
Enigma (German band) songs
Songs written by Michael Cretu
1990 songs
Virgin Records singles
EMI Records singles
Macaronic songs
Music videos directed by Howard Greenhalgh